A hybrid paper-polymer banknote or Composite Substrate is a banknote made from a mixture of paper and polymer substance.

Hybrid banknotes are essentially a paper banknote with a polymer patch. A polymer patch/band is applied vertically over the entire height of paper banknote, thus creating a clear window. The height of the polymer window generally measures 74 mm depending on the height of the banknote × 16 mm. Its thickness is 25 microns. Bulgaria was the first country to produce a hybrid paper polymer banknote, in a denomination of 20 Bulgarian Leva in 2005.Manufactures of hybrid banknotes include Giesecke+Devrient's Hybrid and Varifeye, De La Rue's Optiks, Louisenthal's Hybrid, Landqart AG's DuraSafe and Banque de France's EverFit.

The countries which use hybrid banknotes include:

Gallery

References 

Banknotes
Numismatics